Capt. Jonathan Alden Sr. ( – February 14, 1697), the son of Mayflower immigrants, was a military officer and farm owner in Plymouth Colony. The home he built in the late 1600s is now a National Historic Landmark in Duxbury, Massachusetts.

Early life

Jonathan Alden was born  in the seaside town of Duxbury in Plymouth Colony. He was the fifth of ten children born to John Alden (–1687) and Priscilla Mullins (–), who both arrived on the historic 1620 voyage of the Mayflower. John Alden, a cooper by trade, was a member of the Mayflower's crew and Priscilla Mullins was a passenger.

In 1627, about five years before Jonathan Alden's birth, John Alden was granted 169 acres along the Bluefish River in Duxbury, where he built a home near Eagletree Pond. John and Priscilla Alden raised all of their children on their Duxbury farm.

Civic and military service

Jonathan Alden was made a freeman in 1657. He was asked to survey land and provide a report to the court about routes for a highway in 1685. In 1689, he was elected a selectman for the town of Duxbury.

Alden had a long career in Plymouth Colony's military force. In 1658, at the age of 26, he was made an ensign in the Duxbury company. In the same year, the colony's forces were placed under the command of Major Josiah Winslow. About 17 years later, Alden fought under Winslow in King Philip's War (1675-1678). In 1681, Alden was made a lieutenant and, in 1689, he was made a captain of the Duxbury company.

Alden house

The Alden family built two homes on the original 1627 grant in Duxbury. The first home—the childhood home of Jonathan Alden and his siblings—was built in 1632 at Eagletree Pond and demolished sometime before 1687. Its foundation was discovered in 1960 by archeologist Roland W. Robbins. The second Alden home was constructed 100 yards away and is now a museum at the Alden House Historic Site. The older, east side of the present home, which includes the great room and master chamber, was built by Jonathan Alden in the late 1600s. Recent research suggests it was constructed about the time of Alden's marriage in 1672, while tradition asserts it was built in 1653. Timbers in the west side of the home were erected in the early 1700s when it was owned by his son John Alden (–1739).

Family
Jonathan Alden's brother John Alden Jr. (–1702) was convicted and imprisoned for witchcraft in the Salem witch trials in 1692. His sister Elisabeth Alden (1623–1717) allegedly was the first child of European parents to be born in New England.

At the age of 40, Jonathan Alden married Abigail Hallett (–1725), daughter of Andrew Hallett, on December 10, 1672. They had six children in Duxbury: Elizabeth, Anna, Sarah, John, Andrew, and Jonathan Jr.

Death and tribute

Jonathan Alden died on February 14, 1697, in Duxbury, leaving an estate of £309 (about US$67,500 in 2022). He was given a military funeral and "buried under arms." He was interred near his parents in Myles Standish Burial Ground, the oldest maintained cemetery in the United States.

The funeral sermon was delivered by Rev. Ichabod Wiswall:

In the early 1800s, Ezra Weston IV, who had restored tombstones in the Myles Standish Burial Ground, found the broken tombstone of Jonathan Alden and took it home where it remained for thirty years. In 1880, it came into the possession of Lucia Alden Bradford.  Her nephew, Lawrence Bradford, searched the burial ground and found the original broken base that matched the bottom edge of the tombstone.  The original tombstone—the oldest extant carved gravestone in the cemetery—is now preserved in a stone frame on that spot.

Notes

References

Citations

Bibliography

External links
John and Priscilla Alden descendancy chart at alden.org
Alden Farm Grant map at alden.org
Famous Kin of Jonathan Alden at  famouskin.com  
Jonathan Alden’s Traveling Gravestone at hereliesburied.com

1632 births
1697 deaths
People of colonial Massachusetts
People from Duxbury, Massachusetts
Early colonists in America
Burials at Myles Standish Burial Ground